Persian Inscriptions on Indian Monuments is a book written in Persian by Dr Ali Asghar Hekmat E Shirazi and published in 1956 and 1958 and 2013.  New edition contains the Persian texts of more than 200 epigraphical inscriptions found on historical monuments in India, many of which are currently listed as national heritage sites or registered as UNESCO world heritage, published in Persian; an English edition is also being printed.

Third edition
After being forgotten for over 50 years, a third edition of the book has been printed by Dr. Mohammad Ajam. the absence of the book was felt particularly by students of the Persian language and literature, as well as linguistics. The new edition includes images of many of the inscriptions it describes, as well as a new seventh chapter consisting of five parts.
The new edition of the book has been published under a different title: Persian Inscriptions on the Indian World Heritage Sites. because many of the stone inscriptions it describes have been preserved and registered as world heritage The new edition contains more than 120 images.

Book contents 
In India, Persian inscriptions are usually found on buildings such as mosques and tombs, or on secular edifices including forts, palaces, gateways, water tanks, wells, gardens and bridges. Certain movable objects such as seals, signets, vases and eating utensils often bear inscriptions too. Most pre-Mughal Indian Islamic and Persian inscriptions in India date from the last decade of the 12th century AD, when Muhammad Ghori (Guri) conquered Delhi and established his sultanate there. However, a small number of inscriptions have been found in Haryana, Gujarat and Kerala which bear earlier dates.

In Persian, Arabic and (more recently) Urdu inscriptions found in India, the dynasties represented most prominently are the Mamluks, the Khaljis, the Tughluqs, the Sayyids, the Lodis, the Mughals and Surs (in the center). Many other regional dynasties also receive prominent representation in inscriptions within India. When the powerful Mughals and (khorasanid) dynasties assumed power, they used Persian as the main language for all academic and administrative matters, including inscriptions, coins, official letters and many others. Under the later Mughals, many of the regional principalities became autonomous and continued using Persian as their official language. Later, when Urdu came into wider use, its existence was also recorded in inscriptions.

In addition to Arabic, Persian and Urdu inscriptions, there are also bilingual and even trilingual inscriptions (for example, in Arabic combined with regional languages such as Gujarati, Bengali, Tamil and Malayalam, or Persian combined with provincial languages such as Kannada, Telugu, Oriya, Tamil, Gujarati and Marathi). Persian and mixed Quranic Arabic with Persian have been used alongside many other languages, including Sanskrit, Hindi, English, Portuguese and many others. Examples of such inscriptions can be found in Qutb Minar at New Delhi, the Tomb of Akbar the Great at Sikandara, the Adina Mosque at Pandua (Bengal), the Taj Mahal at Agra and many other locations. In addition, Arabic and Persian inscriptions can be found written in various different popular scripts or styles of Islamic Persian Calligraphy, including Kufi, Naskh, Thuluth, Riqa and Nastaliq.  The book describes many palaces, forts, tombs and mosques inscribed with Persian Inscriptions.

Mughal dynasty or Mughal Persian dynasty who originally came from great Khorasan and are known in Iran and Afghanistan as the Gourkanid dynasty also had link to (Ghurid dynasty). Mughal Persian dynasty begins with Babur a Persian word means Tiger. His grandson Akbar developed Indo-Persian culture and the Mughal architecture style developed vigorously during his reign. Among his accomplishments were Agra Fort, the fort-city of Fatehpur Sikri, and the Buland Darwaza. Akbar's son Jahangir commissioned the Shalimar Gardens in Kashmir and Humayun's Tomb. 
Indo-Persian culture reached its zenith during the reign of Shah Jahan, who constructed Taj Mahal, the Jama Masjid, the Shalimar Gardens of Lahore, the Wazir Khan Mosque, and who renovated the Lahore Fort. The last of the great Mughal architects was Aurangzeb, who built the Badshahi Mosque.

First chapter
The first chapter of the book is dedicated to the history of Persian inscription in India, describing the history of epigraphy up to the initial development of Islam and beyond. Sassanid Persian inscriptions can be found in the Ajanta cave, on many coins dating from the reign of Pulakesin II and on the crosses of churches such as St. Thomas Mount and San Thome Basilica in Chennai and St. Mary's Orthodox Valiyapally.

Palaces, citadels
The book describes Persian Inscriptions on many palaces and fort in India including: 
Red castle or The Red Fort is a historic fort in the city of Delhi that served as the main residence of the Mughal Emperors. Emperor Shah Jahan commissioned construction of the Red Fort on 12 May 1638, when he decided to shift his capital from Agra to Delhi. Originally red and white, Shah Jahan's favourite colours, its design is credited to architect Ustad Ahmad Lahori, who also constructed the Taj Mahal. It was constructed between May 1639 and April 1648.It was conquered by Nader shah of Persia.
 in the Rashtrapati Bhavan and the buildings in this complex there are many Persian inscriptions especially in the hall of Ashoka (former Persika). Rashtrapati Bhavan is the official residence of the President of India it may refer to only the 340-room main building that has the president's official residence, including reception halls, guest rooms and offices, also called the mansion; it may also refer to the entire 130-hectare (320 acre) Presidential Estate that additionally includes huge presidential gardens (Mughal Gardens), large open spaces, residences of bodyguards and staff, stables, other offices and utilities within its perimeter walls. In terms of area, it is the largest residence of any head of state in the world.

Mausoleums 
The book describes 47 Mausoleum and tombs in India inscribed with Persian Inscriptions. 
Mausoleum of Akbar or Akbar's tomb is the tomb of the Mughal emperor Akbar. This tomb is an important Mughal architectural masterpiece. It was built in 1605–1613 by his son Jahangir and is situated in 119 acres of grounds in Sikandra, a sub of Agra, the best marble stone inscribed with Persian Inscriptions and poem.

Persian inscription in the mosques
The book had described Persian inscription in the 14 mosques in India including: 
The Jama Masjid, Delhi of Delhi, is one of the largest mosques in India. It was built by the Mughal Emperor Shah Jahan between 1650 and 1656 The mosque was completed in 1656 AD with three great gates and two 40 metres high minarets constructed with strips of red sandstone and white marble. The courtyard can accommodate more than 25000 people. There are three domes on the terrace which are surrounded by the two minarets. The architectural plan of Badshahi Masjid, built by Shah Jahan's son Aurangzeb at Lahore, Pakistan, is similar to the Jama Masjid. 
. Shah Jahan also built the Taj Mahal, at Agra and the Red Fort in Old Delhi, which stands opposite the Jama Masjid.it remained the royal mosque of the emperors until the end of the Mughal period.

 Jamia Masjid is a mosque in Srinagar, Jammu and Kashmir, India. Situated at Nowhatta in the middle of the Old City, the Mosque was commissioned by Sultan Sikandar in 1394 CE and completed in 1402 CE, at the behest of Mir Mohammad Hamadani, son of Mir Sayyid Ali Hamadani, and is regarded as one of the most important mosques in Kashmir.The Mosque is located in Downtown which remains a central zone to the religio-political life in Srinagar. Thronged by Muslims every Friday, it is one of the prime tourist attractions of Srinagar.

 Babri Masjid meaning Mosque of Babur (Tiger) was a mosque in Ayodhya, India at a site believed by Hindus to be the birthplace of Hindu deity Rama.

,
 Jama Mosque, Agra
 Jama Mosque, Fatehpur Sikri 
 Qutb Minar complex
 Jama Mosque, Jaunpur 
 Bahmani Sultanate

Akbar works to develop Indo-Persian culture 

Agra Fort   Agra fort is a UNESCO world heritage site in Agra, Uttar Pradesh. Jahangiri Mahal and Humayun's Tomb  Humayun’s Tomb, is often regarded as the first mature example of Mughal architecture.
 Fatehpur Sikri, 
The main religious buildings were the huge Jama Masjid and small Tomb of Salim Chisti. Buland Darwaza, also known as the Gate of Magnificence, was built by Akbar in 1576 to commemorate his victory over Gujarat and the Deccan.
The Tomb of Salim Chishti is famed as one of the finest examples of Mughal architecture in India, built during the years 1580 and 1581.

 The Begum Shahi Mosque is an early 17th-century mosque situated in the Walled City of Lahore, Pakistan. The foundation of this mosque was liad by Mughal Empress Mariam-uz-Zamani and was completed by Jahangir in honor of his mother.

Tomb of I'timād-ud-Daulah*
The tomb of I'timād-ud-Daulahmausoleum in the city of Agra in the Indian state of Uttar Pradesh. the tomb of I'timād-ud-Daulah is often regarded as a draft of the Taj Mahal.Shahi Bridge, Jaunpur was also constructed during the reign of the Mughal Emperor Akbar.

Shah Jahan

The Wazir Khan Mosque in Lahore was commissioned during the reign of Shah Jahan, 
his reign at Agra, Delhi and Lahore. Some examples include the Taj Mahal at Agra, the tomb of his wife Mumtaz Mahal. The Moti Masjid (Pearl Mosque) in the Lahore Fort and the Jama Masjid at Delhi are imposing buildings of his era, Shah Jahan also built sections of the Sheesh Mahal, and Naulakha pavilion, also in Thatta called Shahjahan Mosque. Shah Jahan also built the Red Fort in his new capital at Shah Jahanabad, now Delhi. The red sandstone Red Fort is noted for its special buildings-Diwan-i-Aam and Diwan-i-Khas. 
Taj Mahal*  The Taj Mahal, a World Heritage Site was built between 1630 and 1649 
 Wazir Khan Mosque 

The Wazir Khan Mosque was commissioned during the reign of the Mughal Emperor Shah Jahan in 1634, and completed in 1642
Shalimar Gardens 
 The Shah Jahan Mosque is the central mosque for the city of Thatta, in the Pakistani province of Sindh.
Shahi Hammam is a Persian-style bath which was built in Lahore, Pakistan, in 1635 C.E. during the reign of Emperor Shah Jahan.

In Aurangzeb's reign (1658–1707) 
The Badshahi Mosque in Lahore, Pakistan was commissioned by the sixth Mughal Emperor Aurangzeb.

Additional monuments with Persian Mughal structure  Zinat al-Masjid in Daryaganj was overseen by Aurangzeb's second daughter Zinat-al-Nissa. Aurangzeb's sister Roshan-Ara who died in 1671. The tomb of Roshanara Begum 

Lalbagh Fort (also known as "Fort Aurangabad"), Dhaka, Bangladesh, whose construction started in 1678 during the reign of Aurangzeb’s son Azam Shah.
Sunehri Mosque  
Tomb of Safdar Jang The Tomb of Safdar Jung completed in 1754 is one of the last examples of Mughal Architecture.
Mughal gardens This style was influenced by Persian gardens. Humayun's Tomb, was the first sample of later Mughal gardens.

First part of the Third edition 
The first part from the new edition chapter added in 2013 contains a selection of Persian inscriptions found on the Hyderabad Monuments, dating from the time of the Qutb Shahi dynasty. It also contains inscriptions from the Golkonda fort and the Deccan in the Andhra Pradesh.
  Under the Mughals (1526-1858), Persian replaced Arabic almost throughout the region. The case is more or less the same in the southeastern and southernmost strip comprising the present Indian state of Tamil Nadu, which during a brief spell of Muslim authority there, in the mid-14th century, under the Madura sultanate, and then under the Qoṭbšāhī rulers and the Mughals in the 17th and 18th centuries, and the semi-independent nawwābs of Karnataka, saw extensive use of Persian. Likewise, in easternmost Bengal the epigraphic language was almost exclusively Arabic until the Mughal period, when it was totally replaced by Persian. In Orissa and Assam, which effectively came under Muslim authority in the 17th century, Persian was the language of epigraphs. In westernmost Gujarat, one encounters a curious phenomenon: both prose and verse epigraphs of the Delhi sultanate period (1296-1406), are generally in Persian, but later replaced by Arabic under the Gujarat sultans (1406-1580).The epigraphs of the 16th-17th century ʿĀdelšāhī (924-1097/1518-1686, q.v.) and Qoṭbšāhī (924-1098 /1518-1687) rulers of Bijapur and Golkonda-Hyderabad, respectively, who also had close relations with Persia, furnish better poetry. Surprisingly, in the above-mentioned small chiefdoms, as in parts of Tamil Nadu under the nawwābs of Karnataka, a considerable number of fairly high quality records is found.

Second part of the new edition
Importance of the epigraphs, Calligraphic inscriptions constitute the most important decorative element in Indian Islamic Architecture which attained a high level of perfection in Qutb Minar at Delhi, Adina Mosque at Pandua (in Bengal), Atala Mosque at Jaunpur, Jami Mosques at Ahmedabad, Golconda and Hyderabad, Akbar’s tomb at Sikandra, Ibrahim Rauda at Bijapur and Taj Mahal at Agra.With the help of these epigraphs, we can prepare a list of calligraphers, region-wise and period-wise, whose beautiful calligraphy adorns so many buildings in the width and breadth of the country. Scripts employed in the Perso-Arabic epigraphs include Kufi, Naskh, Thulth and Nastaliq.
The second part contains details of Persian epigraphy on Bengal stones.

Third part
The third part deals with the Mughal/Persian architecture in India. The influence Persian-style architecture and language in India began with the Tughlaq dynasty; in addition, all the ruling dynasties after them were originally from Greater Khorasan, an area dominated by Persian language and culture. The Mughal dynasty also came from Greater Khorasan, which is why the book describes Mughal architecture as the Khorasanid or Persian style of architecture.

Mughal tombs, made from sandstone and marble, emphasise the Persian influence. Among the architectural achievements of this era are the Red Fort at Agra (1565–74) and the walled city of Fatehpur Sikri (1569–74), as well as the Taj Mahal, which was built as a tomb for Queen Mumtaz Mahal by Shah Jahan (1628–58). With its double dome, its recessed archway, its white marble and its parks, as well as the emphasis on symmetry and detail, this building contains many of the key elements of architecture from the period of Shah Jahan. Verses from the Quran were inscribed on the walls of the buildings; problematically, though the depiction of living beings (which was an essential part of the pre-Islamic artistic tradition of India) is forbidden by the Islamic religion.

Fourth part
The fourth part describes the Persian language and its influence over other languages such as Hindi, Urdu and Turkic.
During the last four decades over 10,000 inscriptions have been copied from different parts of the India and duly accessioned, deciphered and listed in the Annual Reports on Indian Epigraphy (ARE) since 1952-53 onwards, under a separate Appendix with an exhaustive introduction. Among the Indian states, Uttar Pradesh has yielded the largest number of Perso-Arabic epigraphs (i.e. 2175), constituting 21.4% of the aggregate, number-wise followed by Maharashtra (over 14%), Gujarat (over 9%), Andhra Pradesh and Madhya Pradesh (about 9%), Rajasthan (about 8%), Kamataka (7%), West Bengal (4%), Bihar, and Jammu & Kashmir (about 4% each), Tamil Nadu (2.55%), Haryana (2%), Delhi (about 2%). About 2,000 Perso-Arabic inscriptions have been published so far in Epigraphia Indo-Moslemica (ElM) and Epigraphia Indica-Arabic and Persian Supplement (EIAPS) from 1907–08 to 1977.[]

Fifth part
The fifth part contains some samples of royal orders, including government instructions, and copies of the Persian drawings found in the museums of Hyderabad and Delhi.
we also come across epigraphical texts composed by rulers like Adil Shahi king Ali II (1656–71), Mughal king BahadurShah II (1837–57) and Nawwab of Awadh Wajid Ali Shah (1848–56).
A vast majority of these poets mentioned in epigraphs are unknown from available sources. those of the Sultanate period, covering approximately 12th to 15th centuries (7th -9th cent. H.) are particularly valuable. The places, to quote a few, where this phenomenon occurred are : Cambay in the 12th to 14th centuries, Karad (Maharashtra) in the 16th century, Hyderabad in the 17th century, Lucknow, Allahabad, Kashmir etc. in the subsequent period.

Indian monuments with Persian inscriptions
According to the book Persian Inscriptions on Indian Monuments, there are nearly 15,000 examples of Persian and Quranic inscriptions in India, mostly found in cities such as Hyderabad, Delhi, Agra and Lucknow, amongst others. The list of historical Indian monuments containing Persian inscriptions and Persian calligraphy includes the following:

 The Qutub Minar
 The Red Fort
 Humayun's Tomb
 Akbar's tomb
 Rashtrapati Bhavan
 The Lodhi Gardens
 Purana Quila
 Safdarjung's Tomb
 Qutb complex
 Mehrauli in South Delhi.

Mehrauli was built by Qutub-ud-din Aibak and heralded the beginning of a new style of art and architecture which came to be known as the Indo-Islamic style. Other monuments included in the Qutub complex are the Jamali Kamali Mosque and Tomb, Balban's tomb, Quli Khan's Tomb, Rajon Ki Baoli in Mehrauli Archaeological Park. In addition, Jahaz Mahal and Adham Khan's Tomb are located on a hilltop nearby.

Other monuments with Persian inscriptions include the following:
 Tughlaqabad
 Bedil Dehlavi
 Amir Khusrow Dehlavi
 Lucknow
 St. James' Church
 Bara Imambara
 Buland Darwaza
 Lahore Fort
 Taj Mahal
 Bibi Ka Maqbara
 Fatehpur Sikri
 Moinuddin Chishti
 Badshahi Masjid
 Ataga Khan

Gallery
Pictures of some of the Indian monuments which contain Persian inscriptions and have been explained in the book: more pictures in flicker

See also
 Archaeological Survey of India
 Epigraphia Indica
 State Protected Monuments of India
 List of World Heritage Sites in India
 Monuments of National Importance (India)
 Delhi Archaeological Society
 Survey of India
 Indo-Persian culture
Mughal architecture
Indo-Islamic architecture
Akbar's tomb
Red Fort
Buland Darwaza
Fatehpur Sikri
Lahore Fort
Taj Mahal
Jama Masjid
Bibi Ka Maqbara
Lucknow
 Khanzada
 Ata Hussain Fani Chishti
 Chishti Order
 Indo-Persian culture
 Khwaja Maudood Chishti
 Khwaja Wali Kirani
Mu'in al-Din Chishti
 Jahangir
Asaf Khan
Achabal Gardens
Mughal Empire
Nurmahal
Nur Jahan
Persian language in the Indian subcontinent
List of Persian calligraphers
Bara Imambara
Chota Imambara
Imambara Ghufran Ma'ab
Imambara Shah Najaf

References

External links
Full word text of the book"Persian Inscriptions on the Indian Monuments" in Persian. 

Free Download and save the old text of the book published in Persian 1958 : 

 Voice book of Persian Inscriptions on Indian Monuments 
The systematic survey and study of Perso-Arabic epigraphy of the Indian 
Archaeological Survey of India 
Iranian Influence On Medieval Indian Architecture. by S.A. Rezvi.
 
 Nur Jahan: Empress of Mughal India, by Ellison Banks Findly, Oxford University Press US. 2000. .excerpts online
Persian Inscriptions on Indian Monuments 
Why is Persian dying out in India, despite its deep roots? Most Persian manuscripts lie unused and locked in Indian libraries and archives. 
Brief history of Persian Calligraphy
About history of Persian Calligraphy and its different styles
Iran India relations span centuries marked by meaningful interactions by Dr. Ajam.

Iranian Influence On Medieval Indian Architecture. by S.A. Rezvi.
 
epigraphical-studies 
Persian Inscriptions on Indian Monuments Persian Inscriptions on Indian Monuments Dr.Mohammad Ajam
SOME PHOTO OF THE BOOK IN FLIKER 
Catalogue of Persian Manuscripts in the Library of the India Office
 

1958 non-fiction books
1956 non-fiction books

Iranian books
Persian inscriptions
Islam in India
Islam in Pakistan
Persian-language books
Indian architectural styles
Books about India
History books about India